North Efate, also known as Nakanamanga or Nguna, is an Oceanic language spoken on the northern area of Efate in Vanuatu, as well as on a number of islands off the northern coast – including Nguna, and parts of Tongoa, Emae and Epi. 

The population of speakers is recorded to be 9,500. This makes Nakanamanga one of the largest languages of Vanuatu, an archipelago known for having the world's highest linguistic density.

Phonology 

The consonant and vowels sounds of North Efate (Nguna).

Subdialects of North Efate include:

 Buninga
 Emau
 Livara
 Nguna
 Paunangis
 Sesake

Typology follows Subject Object Verb order as is observed in Nguna

References

Notes

Central Vanuatu languages
Languages of Vanuatu